David Gilbert Logan (22 November 1871 – 25 February 1964), known as Davie Logan, was a Labour Party politician in the United Kingdom of Scots-Irish descent. He succeeded T.P. O'Connor as member of Parliament for Liverpool Scotland in 1929 (44 years after O'Connor had been first elected).

Born in the Scotland Road area of Liverpool, Logan was the son of Thomas Logan, a ship's cook, and Catherine (McHugh) Logan.

He was Member of Parliament (MP) for Liverpool, Scotland from 1929 until his death in 1964, aged 92, becoming the oldest MP since Samuel Young in 1918. Logan was later surpassed by S. O. Davies, who died in office aged 92. Logan was a longtime associate of the previous MP (O'Connor), as well as having his own strong involvement in the Irish Nationalist movement prior to joining the Labour Party, serving on Liverpool City Council as a nationalist councillor.

He was elected for the Scotland ward from 1909 to 1911, then represented Scotland North from 1911 to 1918 as a Nationalist councillor, before taking the Labour whip. He served until 1931, before becoming an Alderman and leader of Liverpool Labour party from 1942 to 1951.

References

Kelly, Michael (2006),  Liverpool's Irish Connection, AJH Publishing

Notes

External links 
 

1871 births
1964 deaths
Labour Party (UK) MPs for English constituencies
UK MPs 1929–1931
UK MPs 1931–1935
UK MPs 1935–1945
UK MPs 1945–1950
UK MPs 1950–1951
UK MPs 1951–1955
UK MPs 1955–1959
UK MPs 1959–1964
Councillors in Liverpool
Politicians from Liverpool
Members of the Parliament of the United Kingdom for Liverpool constituencies